An LMDh (Le Mans Daytona h) is a type of sports prototype race car that will compete alongside Le Mans Hypercar entries in the Grand Touring Prototype (GTP) class of the IMSA SportsCar Championship from 2023. It also competes in the Hypercar class of the FIA World Endurance Championship.

The LMDh ruleset was created jointly by the International Motor Sports Association (IMSA) and the Automobile Club de l'Ouest (ACO). The cars will serve as the successor to the Daytona Prototype International class, utilising regulations that were planned to become the next-generation Daytona Prototype International ruleset, converged with the Le Mans Hypercar ruleset.

The FIA World Motor Sport Council allowed LMDh cars to participate in the 2022 WEC season on a race-by-race basis, "to ensure the seamless introduction" in 2023.

History

DPi 2.0 
Following the FIA World Endurance Championship's transition to a winter calendar in 2018, IMSA announced in January 2018, that it would extend the homologation periods for LMP2, DPi and GTE-spec machinery in the WeatherTech SportsCar Championship by an additional year. This would delay the homologation periods in the championship by roughly six months, which necessitated the homologation extension from IMSA. As such, the DPi and LMP2 cars, which were originally confirmed for a four-year period through 2020, would now be eligible for competition until at least the end of the 2021 season. Despite calls from manufacturers to retain the DPi platform and regulations for the 2022 season, then-IMSA President Scott Atherton announced that IMSA was looking at other options beyond a further extension to the life of the DPi platform.

On May 6 2019, IMSA announced that the next generation DPi ruleset, known as DPi 2.0 would be an evolution based on the current LMP2-based platform, featuring Hybrid technology from a single supplier, with supply voltage being unconfirmed. A few days later, IMSA's VP of Competition Simon Hodgson stated that the next-generation DPi regulations would be expected to  feature increased styling measures, by opening up more areas where manufacturers were able to add styling cues. Hodgson also indicated that the enlarged scope for styling cues may also come alongside regulations that dictated minimum level of styling required from each manufacturer.

On June 24 2019, it was revealed that IMSA had held discussions with manufacturers regarding the incorporation of hybrid technology in the next-generation DPi ruleset, with manufacturers on the DPi 2.0 steering committee divided over the level electrification in the hybrid systems. Electrification concepts proposed included high and low-voltage systems of varying costs. A further meeting held in late June saw a 400-volt system, providing in the range of 70-90 kW (90-120 hp) of electric power emerge as the leading electrification option. However, despite 400-volt systems having emerged as the leading option in June, it was revealed in September that discussions had yet to reach any form of consensus, although it was agreed that manufacturers could build their own hybrid systems.

DPi 2.0 and LMH convergence 
Following the 2019 "Super Sebring" weekend which saw the 2019 12 Hours of Sebring held on the same weekend as the inaugural 1000 Miles of Sebring, WEC CEO Gerard Neveu revealed the possibility of DPi becoming included as part of the "Hypercar" regulations, with the integration of DPis depending on the performance levels of both platforms.  On July 31, 2019, FIA World Endurance Championship CEO Gerard Neveu revealed that an active effort was underway between the ACO and IMSA technical departments to seek similar performance targets between Hypercar and DPi 2.0, which would allow for both platforms to eventually crossover and compete head to head. 

On November 11, 2019, WEC's sole LMP1 manufacturer Toyota stated it would be open for DPi integration into the FIA World Endurance Championship's top class, on the condition it would not hinder the Japanese manufacturer from displaying its hybrid technology. Shortly after the release of the LMH Technical regulations, McLaren announced it would not be considering a LMH programme, and instead called for DPi to be brought into the WEC, with McLaren Racing CEO Zak Brown stating that a LMH programme was unviable for the British manufacturer, calling for steep reduction in costs. Ford and Porsche expressed similar sentiments, calling for convergence between LMH and DPi.

On 15 January 2020, Toyota Racing Development president and general manager David Wilson expressed support for convergence between both platforms, stating that convergence of the 2 platforms would serve as a compelling reason for Lexus to launch a DPi programme.

LMDh 

On 24 January 2020, ahead of the 2020 24 Hours of Daytona, a joint ACO and IMSA press conference was held at the Daytona International Speedway, where ACO and IMSA announced the new LMDh ruleset. It would supersede the Daytona Prototype International, and was converged with the Le Mans Hypercar regulations. It was planned to first be introduced in Europe starting from September 2021, before having its North American debut in 2022 at the 2022 Rolex 24 at Daytona.

Despite initial plans to allow manufacturers to build their own hybrid systems, this was scrapped in the draft LMDh regulations released in May, in favour of a spec 50hp hybrid system. The draft regulations stated that a car weight of 1030 kg, 500 kW peak of combined power from engine and hybrid system, a single bodywork package, a single tyre supplier, alongside a global Balance of Performance system to balance out LMDh and LMH cars.
The gearbox hybrid system will be supplied by Xtrac with an integrated motor generator unit supplied by Bosch and batteries from Williams Advanced Engineering. The chassis suppliers will be Dallara, Ligier, Multimatic and Oreca. IMSA has said it will refer to the class as GTP, in reference to the 1980s category.

Confirmed manufacturers

See also
Le Mans Hypercar

References

External links 

 24 Heures du Mans - What is a Hypercar? (2021; 24 Heures du Mans at YouTube)

Sports car racing
Le Mans Daytona h